In Greek mythology, Calesius (Ancient Greek: Καλήσιος) was the attendant and charioteer of Axylus. He is mentioned in Book VI of Homer's Iliad where he is killed with his master by Diomedes.

See also
 List of Greek mythological figures

Note

References 

 Homer, The Iliad with an English Translation by A.T. Murray, Ph.D. in two volumes. Cambridge, MA., Harvard University Press; London, William Heinemann, Ltd. 1924. . Online version at the Perseus Digital Library.
 Homer, Homeri Opera in five volumes. Oxford, Oxford University Press. 1920. . Greek text available at the Perseus Digital Library.

Characters in the Iliad